Junior Nsemba is a professional rugby league footballer who plays as a  or  forward for Whitehaven RLFC in the RFL Championship, on loan from the Wigan Warriors in the Betfred Super League.

In 2022 Nsemba made his Super League début for Wigan against Hull Kingston Rovers.

References

External links
Wigan Warriors profile

2004 births
Living people
Rugby league props
Whitehaven R.L.F.C. players
Wigan Warriors players